Delano or DeLano may refer to:

Places in the United States
 Delano, California
 Delano, Wichita, Kansas, a neighborhood in Wichita and former community before merging with Wichita
 Delano, Minnesota
 Delano, Nevada
 Delano, Pennsylvania
 Delano, Tennessee
 Delano Township, Schuylkill County, Pennsylvania
 Delano Peak, a mountain in Utah
 Delano Hotel, Miami Beach
 Delano Las Vegas, a hotel located within the Mandalay Bay complex in Las Vegas
 Delano, Wichita, Kansas

People 
Surname
 Adore Delano (born 1989), American drag queen, singer-songwriter and television personality
 Diane Delano (born 1957), American actor
 Francis Roach Delano (1823-1887), American businessman and politician
 The Delano family, a prominent American political family including:
 Columbus Delano (1809–1896), American congressman and government official
 Francis R. Delano (1842–1892), American banker, prison warden and railroad superintendent
 Frederic Adrian Delano (1863–1953), American railroad president, first Federal Reserve Vice Chairman
 Gerald Curtis Delano (1890–1972), American painter
 Jane Delano (1862–1919), American nurse
 Paul Delano (1775–1842), U.S. sea captain, Commander in the Chilean Navy
 Philip Delano (1603–1682), member of Plymouth Colony, North America
 Sara Roosevelt nee Delano (1854–1941), mother of Franklin Delano Roosevelt
 William Adams Delano (1874–1960), American architect of Delano & Aldrich
 Jack Delano (1914–1997), American photographer and composer
 Jamie Delano (born 1954), British comics writer
 Jon Delano (active 1980-present), journalist, professor at Carnegie Mellon University
 Lee Delano (1931–2017), American actor
 Michael DeLano (born 1940), American actor
 Warren Lyford DeLano (1972–2009), American advocate for open-source practices in sciences

Given name
 Delano Burgzorg (born 1998), Nederlander football player
 Lano Hill (formerly Delano, b. 1995), US American football player
 Delano Johnson (born 1988), US American football player
 Delano Ladan (born 2000), Nederlander football player
 Delano Lewis (born 1938), American attorney, businessman and diplomat
 Delano Sam-Yorke (born 1989), English footballer
 Delano Stewart (born 1947), Jamaican singer
 Delano Thomas (born 1983), American indoor volleyball player
 Delano Williams (born 1993), British sprinter
 Delano E. Williamson (1822-1903), American politician, former Indiana Attorney General

Middle name
 Joan Aiken (Joan Delano Aiken) (1924–2004), British author
 Dési Delano Bouterse (born 1945), 8th President of Suriname
 Adrian Delano Dantley (born 1955), American basketball player
 J. Delano Ellis (1944–2020), American Pentecostal bishop and writer
 Franklin Delano Floyd (1943–2023), American murderer
 Tyrone Delano Gilliam Jr. (1966–1998), American murderer
 Ki-Jana Delano Hoever (born 2002), Nederlander football player
 Franklin Delano Roosevelt (1882–1945), 32nd president of the United States (1933–1945)

Other uses 
 The Delano grape strike in California, US
 DeLano Scientific LLC
 The Delano 7, a fictional spacecraft in Metroid Prime Hunters and Metroid Prime 3: Corruption

See also 

 Delanoë